Joël Suty (born 4 July 1960) is a French gymnast. He competed at the 1980 Summer Olympics and the 1984 Summer Olympics. He also competed in the men's 10 metre platform diving at the 1976 Summer Olympics.

References

External links
 

1960 births
Living people
French male artistic gymnasts
French male divers
Olympic gymnasts of France
Olympic divers of France
Gymnasts at the 1980 Summer Olympics
Gymnasts at the 1984 Summer Olympics
Gymnasts at the 1988 Summer Olympics
Divers at the 1976 Summer Olympics
Place of birth missing (living people)
French sports coaches
20th-century French people